Dittersdorfer Höhe is an elevation in Amtsberg, in the state of Saxony, Germany. The hill has an elevation of 553 meters (1,816 feet) and features a country inn. Dittersdorfer Höhe is the highest point in Amtsberg.

References

Mountains of Saxony
Mountains of the Ore Mountains